is a Japanese politician, currently a member of the Social Democratic Party serving in the House of Representatives. He is opposed to the Anti-Conspiracy Bill.

References

1967 births
Social Democratic Party (Japan) politicians
Members of the House of Representatives (Japan)
Living people